Lonbar is a village about 100 km from the Caspian Sea. Located in northwestern Iran it is in Sanjabad-e Sharqi Rural District of the Central District of Khalkhal County, Ardabil province. At the 2006 census, its population was 1,498 in 343 households. The following census in 2011 counted 1,309 people in 345 households. The latest census in 2016 showed a population of 921 people in 285 households; it was the largest village in its rural district.

References 

Khalkhal County

Towns and villages in Khalkhal County

Populated places in Ardabil Province

Populated places in Khalkhal County